Osnabrück-Sutthausen is a railway station located in Osnabrück, Germany. The station is on the Osnabrück–Brackwede railway. The train services are operated by NordWestBahn.

Train services
The station is served by the following services:

Local services  Osnabrück - Halle (Westf) - Bielefeld

Bus services
There is a bus service to Osnabrück.

References

Railway stations in Lower Saxony
Buildings and structures in Osnabrück